Mark Steven Alarie (born December 11, 1963) is an American former professional basketball player who played in the National Basketball Association (NBA). He was listed at 6'7" and 217 lb.

Playing career
Alarie attended Brophy College Preparatory, where he was the Arizona Player of the Year for 1982 after averaging 29.9 points and 17.3 rebounds per game. Alarie was named the state's No. 4 player on The Arizona Republic's All-Century team in 2000 and was inducted into the azcentral High School Sports Hall of Fame in 2008.

After high school, he went to Duke University, where he was a two-time All-Atlantic Coast Conference first team selection and a third team All-American as a senior in 1986, when Duke played in the NCAA championship game. Alarie was drafted in the first round, as the 18th pick of the 1986 NBA draft, by the Denver Nuggets (playing there one season).

Alarie's fourth season was his best, averaging 10.5 points and 4.6 rebounds per game for the Washington Bullets (1987–1991, retired aged 27 due to recurring knee injuries).

Personal life
Alarie is married to Rene Augustine, who was appointed Acting Deputy Assistant Attorney General of the Antitrust Division at the Department of Justice in 2019.

Alarie's daughter Isabella, known as Bella, attended Princeton and played on the basketball team from 2016 to 2020. She received numerous Ivy League honors during her first year and went on to be named Ivy League Player of the Year in her final three seasons. In the WNBA draft, Bella was selected fifth overall by the Dallas Wings.

References

External links

Mark Alarie business bio

1963 births
Living people
All-American college men's basketball players
American men's basketball players
Basketball players from Phoenix, Arizona
Denver Nuggets draft picks
Denver Nuggets players
Duke Blue Devils men's basketball players
Navy Midshipmen men's basketball coaches
Parade High School All-Americans (boys' basketball)
Small forwards
Sportspeople from Phoenix, Arizona
Washington Bullets players